
Gmina Regimin is a rural gmina (administrative district) in Ciechanów County, Masovian Voivodeship, in east-central Poland.

Villages
Gmina Regimin contains the villages and settlements of Grzybowo, Jarluty Duże, Jarluty Małe, Kalisz, Karniewo, Kątki, Klice, Kliczki, Kozdroje, Koziczyn, Lekówiec, Lekowo, Lipa, Mościce, Pawłówko, Pawłowo, Pniewo Wielkie, Pniewo-Czeruchy, Przybyszewo, Radomka, Regimin, Szulmierz, Targonie, Trzcianka, Włosty and Zeńbok.

Neighbouring gminas
Gmina Regimin is bordered by the gminas of Ciechanów, Czernice Borowe, Grudusk, Opinogóra Górna, Strzegowo and Stupsk.

References

Polish official population figures 2006

Regimin
Ciechanów County